Fred Schonewille (born 3 March 1969) is a Dutch lawyer, lecturer and former politician.

Schonewille studied at the University of Leiden and the University of Stellenbosch in South Africa. From 23 May 2002 to 30 January 2003 he was a Member of Parliament for the Pim Fortuyn List in the House of Representatives. He later joined the proposed List New Politics party founded by Herman Heinsbroek for the 2003 election which ultimately did not stand. Following his political career, Schonewille has worked as an assistant professor at Utrecht University and as a columnist for De Volkskrant.

References 

1969 births
Living people
Members of the House of Representatives (Netherlands)
People from Assen
Pim Fortuyn List politicians
21st-century Dutch politicians
20th-century Dutch lawyers